The frogfish is a family of anglerfish, Antennariidae, in the order Lophiiformes.

Frogfish may also refer to:
 Australian frogfish, a ray-finned fish in the order Batrachoidiformes, an ambush predator
 Archaically fishes of the genus Lophius